This is a list of rulers of the Mahi state of Savalu, located in present-day Benin.

Rulers of the Mahi state of Savalu

See also
Benin
Mahi states
Mahi people
Lists of office-holders

References
 Benin traditional polities

Benin history-related lists